"The Divine Zero" is a song by American rock band Pierce the Veil. It was released as the lead single off of their fourth studio album, Misadventures, on June 18, 2015, via digital download. The song was written by vocalist Vic Fuentes and produced by Dan Korneff. "The Divine Zero" was nominated for Song Of The Year at the 2016 Alternative Press Music Awards.

Background

Following Pierce the Veil's extensive touring in support of their third studio album, Collide with the Sky (2012), the band wrote and recorded material for a fourth studio album throughout the later half of 2014 with producer Dan Korneff. The lead single, "The Divine Zero", was released without previous announcements on Thursday, June 18, 2015 to iTunes Store and other digital download outlets. The song was performed throughout the band's set on the 2015 Vans Warped Tour.

Charts

Track listing
Digital download
The Divine Zero" – 4:12

Personnel
Pierce the Veil
 Vic Fuentes – vocals, rhythm guitar
 Tony Perry – lead guitar
 Jaime Preciado – bass
 Mike Fuentes – drums, percussion

Production
 Dan Korneff – production

Release history

References

Pierce the Veil songs
2015 songs
2015 singles
Fearless Records singles
Songs written by Vic Fuentes